Michael James Marra is a Scottish Labour politician who has been a Member of the Scottish Parliament (MSP) for North East Scotland since May 2021.

Early life
Michael Marra was born in Dundee in 1979. He joined the Labour Party as a teenager.  

Marra was educated at St John's High School, the University of Glasgow and the London School of Economics.

Before becoming an MSP, Marra worked for Oxfam and the Leverhulme Research Centre for Forensic Science at the University of Dundee.

Political career
Michael Marra was elected as a councillor in Dundee's Lochee ward in 2017. He stood down at the 2022 election. 

Marra previously worked for Scottish Labour Leader Iain Gray as an advisor prior to and during the 2011 Scottish Parliamentary election. 

In November 2020, Marra was confirmed as a candidate on Labour's regional list for the North East, coinciding with his sister Jenny Marra announcement that she would not seek re-election to the Scottish Parliament.

On 8 May 2021 Marra was elected as a Member of the Scottish Parliament (MSP) for North East Scotland. He had been appointed as Education and Skills spokesperson in Scottish Labour's campaign cabinet just before the 2021 Scottish Parliament elections.  He was retained as Shadow Cabinet Secretary for Education and Skills after the election.

He has described himself as being part of Labour's "soft left". 

In 2021 Michael Marra won the Holyrood magazine “One For The Watching” award, a newcomer award judged by a panel made up of senior MSPs, journalists, and Scotland’s two top pollsters.

Injury Time campaign 
Since 2021, Marra has been campaigning for Alzheimer's disease in footballers to be classed as an industrial disease. A study carried out for the Football Association and the Professional Footballers’ Association in 2019 discovered that there was a five-fold increase in Alzheimer’s disease among the former players.

Marra had said: “The Scottish Government must recognise that these injuries are a form of industrial disease and allow these players to access the support they need, and deserve.”

Personal life 
Michael Marra is married and has three children.

He is a lifelong Dundee United supporter.

His uncle is the Dundonian folk singer Michael Marra, who died in 2012.

Michael Marra has an interest in the history and writings of Abraham Lincoln.

References

External links 
 

Year of birth missing (living people)
Living people
Politicians from Dundee
Labour MSPs
Members of the Scottish Parliament 2021–2026